Carabanzo is one of 24 parishes (administrative divisions) in Lena, a municipality within the province and autonomous community of Asturias, in coastal northern Spain.  

Its origins date to Roman times.  Its name is a variant of the Latin carabantium (caravan).  

References

External links

 Asturian society of economic and industrial studies, English language version of "Sociedad Asturiana de Estudios Económicos e Industriales" (SADEI)

Parishes in Lena